Arthur Cobb Hardy (1895–1977) was president of the Optical Society of America from 1935-36.  He was awarded the Edward Longstreth Medal from the Franklin Institute in 1939 and the Frederic Ives Medal in 1957.

See also
Optical Society of America#Past Presidents of the OSA

References

External links
 Articles Published by early OSA Presidents Journal of the Optical Society of America

Presidents of Optica (society)
20th-century American physicists
1895 births
1977 deaths
Fellows of the American Physical Society